Spring Brook Township may refer to the following townships in the United States:

 Spring Brook Township, Kittson County, Minnesota
 Spring Brook Township, Lackawanna County, Pennsylvania